Marcus Högström (born March 20, 1989) is a Swedish former professional ice hockey defenceman who played in the Swedish Hockey League (SHL).

Playing career 
Högström played in the youth set-ups of Svegs IK, Skellefteå AIK and MODO Hockey. He then spent the 2009-10 campaign with Molot-Prikamie Perm in Russia's second-tier league. He made his Elitserien debut playing with Skellefteå AIK during the 2010–11 Elitserien season and would jump between Sweden's top-flight and the second division HockeyAllsvenskan in the following years, playing for clubs like Timrå IK, IF Sundsvall Hockey, Malmö Redhawks, Almtuna IS and Djurgårdens IF.

After two full seasons with Djurgårdens IF in the Elitserie, he left for the Kontinental Hockey League (KHL) in 2016, joining HC Spartak Moscow. He was waived by the KHL side in late November 2016 and accepted an offer from Finnish Liiga outfit HIFK a couple of days later.

During his second stint with Djurgårdens IF, and in the midst of a successful 2017–18 season, Högström was signed to a three-year contract extension through to 2022 on February 7, 2018. As Djurgårdens reached the semi-finals, Högström contributed with 3 goals and 23 points in 50 regular season games.

On June 12, 2018, Högström sought a release from his contract with Djurgårdens IF after securing a one-year, two-way contract as a 29-year-old with the Calgary Flames of the National Hockey League (NHL). In his debut 2018–19 North American season, after attending the Flames training camp, Högström was assigned to American Hockey League affiliate, the Stockton Heat. Högström's season was cut short, contributing with 2 assists in 12 games before he was ruled out with injury.

As an impending free agent from the Flames, Högström opted for a return to Sweden in rejoining Djurgårdens IF of the SHL on a two-year contract on May 10, 2019.

International play
Högström received his first cap for Sweden's men's national team in April 2016.

Career statistics

References

External links

1989 births
Living people
Almtuna IS players
Asplöven HC players
Djurgårdens IF Hockey players
HIFK (ice hockey) players
Malmö Redhawks players
Skellefteå AIK players
HC Spartak Moscow players
Stockton Heat players
IF Sundsvall Hockey players
Swedish ice hockey defencemen
Timrå IK players